This is a list of wars involving Armenia and its predecessor states.
The list gives the name, the date, the combatants, and the result of these conflicts following this legend:

Peacekeeping missions

See also
 List of wars involving Russia
 List of wars involving Azerbaijan
 List of wars involving Georgia (country)
 Military history of Armenia

References

 
Armenia
Wars